Carbon quantitative easing (CQE) is an unconventional monetary policy that is featured in a proposed international climate policy, called a global carbon reward. A major goal of CQE is to finance the global carbon reward by managing the exchange rate of a proposed representative currency, called a carbon currency. The carbon currency will be an international unit of account that will represent the mass of carbon that is effectively mitigated and then rewarded under the policy. The carbon currency will function primarily as a store of value and not as a medium of exchange.

CQE is designed to manage the exchange rate of the carbon currency by enacting an internationally agreed floor price for the currency. The floor price should rise predictably over many decades in order to deliver on the main goals of the 2015 Paris Agreement.

CQE is the name given to the currency trading operations of central banks that have agreed to cooperate and coordinate their efforts in order to guarantee the floor price for the carbon currency. In addition to the currency trading, central banks should telegraph their intentions by advertising the future exchange rate of the carbon currency to market participants, thereby increasing private demand for the carbon currency in the foreign exchange market.

With CQE, it is proposed that market participants will accept the new carbon currency as an investment-grade asset given that it will have relatively low financial risk, relatively high appreciation, and relatively high liquidity.

History 
CQE was first proposed in 2017 by Delton Chen, Joël van der Beek, and Jonathan Cloud in order to create a new socioeconomic roadmap for delivering the main goals of the 2015 Paris Agreement. CQE was reviewed in 2018 by Guglielmo Zappalá as part of an economics thesis, and it was first mentioned in the mainstream media in 2020 with two online articles appearing in Bloomberg's business news service.

CQE has yet to be included in mainstream narratives on the economics of climate change even though it has the scope to address many critically important climate-related systemic risks, such as weak carbon pricing, lack of climate funding, and lack of societal cooperation.

Monetary policy 
The ideal implementation of CQE will involve every central bank in the world, however CQE can be implemented with just the central banks of the 20-40 largest economies, approximately, given that this group of central banks represents about 80-90% of the world economy by nominal GDP. Prior to applying CQE, the participating central banks need to be given a mandate that allows them to manage the exchange rate of a currency that represents mitigated carbon. The representative currency is the economic instrument of the global carbon reward policy. The currency will establish a positive price signal that will complement carbon taxes, cap-and-trade and non-market policies that are also implemented.

Carbon currency 
The representative currency should be denominated in carbon mitigation services. A unit of account of 1000 kg CO2e mitigated for a 100-year duration, or similar, is recommended. The proposed representative currency may be called a carbon-backed currency, or more simply it may be called a carbon currency. The carbon currency will not be legal tender in any country, and it will only be traded as a financial asset.

The carbon currency will provide three key functions: it will function as a financial incentive, as a store of value, and as an accounting instrument for recording the carbon stocktake under the global carbon reward policy. The total supply of the carbon currency will be proportional to the total mass of carbon that is mitigated and rewarded. All of the carbon stocktake will be retired from carbon markets, and so the carbon currency will not act as a carbon offset because there will be no carbon offsetting under the policy.

Central banks that participate in CQE will be instructed to create additional bank reserves (MB) to buy the carbon currency in open markets. The expansion of MB and the associated currency trading should be coordinated in order to give the carbon currency an exchange rate floor that is calibrated to meet the goals of the Paris Agreement. The purpose of CQE is to underwrite the long-term floor price of the carbon currency while the supply of the carbon currency is increasing over time. The supply of the carbon currency will increase when it is issued to enterprises as a financial reward for their climate mitigation services.

Carbon exchange authority 
CQE and the carbon currency will be managed by a supranational authority, called a carbon exchange authority. The carbon exchange authority will ensure that the devaluation of national currencies via CQE will be as uniform as possible between nations, and this is to ensure that the resulting monetary inflation is politically acceptable and economically benign. The currency devaluation process does not apply to the fiat currencies that are not part of the CQE program.

The carbon exchange authority will be responsible for the mitigation assessments, and also for the accountability, fungibility and transparency of the carbon currency. For this reason, central banks that participate in CQE are not required to undertake any technical assessments of climate mitigation services, thus allowing them to focus on their other responsibilities.

Market policy 
CQE is an essential part of the global carbon reward policy however this policy also includes a sophisticated new market policy for managing the supply-side of the carbon currency. The market policy is needed to enable the orderly issuance of the carbon currency and the provision and enforcement of service-level agreements on a case-by-case basis. The service-level agreements are needed to define the rules for estimating the mass of carbon emissions that are avoided, and the mass of carbon that is removed from the ambient atmosphere. The service-level agreements are also needed to define the standards for monitoring, reporting, verifying, and policing, and to address any defaulting by participating enterprises.

Potential advantages 
The historical failure of the global community to share the costs of climate mitigation is sometimes described as a type of prisoner's dilemma. A potential advantage of CQE is that it could be used to overcome the prisoner's dilemma by financing a global carbon reward without creating any new debts for governments, businesses, or citizens. This capacity to finance climate mitigation at the global scale—and without imposing any direct costs on stakeholders—could be instrumental in avoiding political disputes and maximising cooperation at all levels of society. CQE offers an entirely new channel for scalable climate finance that could be used to protect the global commons.

Related technologies 
CQE and the carbon currency could be implemented using a number of different digital technologies and settlement systems. One option is to request central banks to purchase the carbon currency with conventional bank reserves. In this option, the commercial banks, public banks and currency traders could act as intermediaries between the wholesale and retail markets for the proposed carbon currency. Alternatively, the participating central banks could develop their own Central Bank Digital Currencies (CBDCs) that act like digital cash. With the second option, the carbon currency could be developed and traded as a new type of CBDC on a common platform for the inter-bank trading of CBDCs.

Comparison with other monetary policies

Quantitative easing 
Quantitative easing (QE) by central banks typically involves the purchase of government bonds, corporate bonds and other financial assets to increase the broad money supply (M1)—either directly or indirectly. CQE, on the other hand, will result in a direct increase in M1 with the additional currency being injected into the economy as debt-free finance for climate mitigation services. CQE is therefore a targeted form of QE. CQE is also strongly biased towards decarbonising the economy, whereas conventional patterns of QE have been found to support carbon-intensive industries.

Green quantitative easing 
Green quantitative easing (green QE) involves the trading of green bonds or climate bonds by individual central banks. According to a study by the Foundation for European Progressive Studies, the application of green QE could help to mitigate climate change but on its own could not substantially influence the Earth's global average surface temperature or prevent severe climate change. CQE is significantly different to green QE because CQE aims to coordinate and aggregate the efforts of the major central banks, thereby generating an outcome that is more strongly correlated to global reductions in greenhouse gas emissions. Unlike green QE, CQE will not require central banks to undertake any technical assessments of climate mitigation, and this is because the proposed carbon exchange authority will take responsibility for the accountability, fungibility, and transparency of the carbon currency.

Modern Monetary Theory 
Modern Monetary Theory (MMT) is a heterodox macroeconomic theory that is concerned with increasing the supply of national currencies for funding public goods and encouraging full employment. CQE is significantly different to the monetary policies that are proposed under MMT, and this is because CQE is designed to expand the money supply for the world economy by coordinating central bank currency operations to achieve an international goal. MMT, on the other hand, aims to expand the money supply of an individual nation for domestic reasons. Furthermore, CQE and the carbon currency do not depend on borrowing, debt creation or interest charges. This is because the time value of the carbon currency is embodied in service-level agreements that require the physical mitigation of greenhouse gas emissions over the long-term, potentially for a 100-year duration. These service-level agreements define the standards for monitoring, reporting, verifying, and policing of the carbon stock take. CQE is unlikely to pose a direct inflationary risk for any one country because CQE attempts to spread the resulting monetary inflation across the globe.

Gold Standard 
CQE and the associated carbon standard are analogous to the gold standard under the Bretton Woods system. This is because both standards are designed to link the value of national fiat currencies to the management of specific chemical elements that play a pivotal role in the organisation of an industrialised global civilisation.

References

External links 
 https://globalcarbonreward.org

Climate change mitigation
Monetary policy